The Evangelical Reformed Churches in Poland (in Polish its called the Ewangeliczny Kosciol Reformowany) is a Reformed church in the country of Poland. This church is a member of the World Communion of Reformed Churches and strives to teach ERC principles to their followers and follow the sacred scripture (ERC Poland).

Origin 
Evangelical Reformed Churches (Ewangeliczny Kosciol Reformowany) in Poland were founded in 1995 and since 2006 are members of the Confederation of Reformed Evangelical Churches. There are two particular churches (in Poznań and Wrocław) and two mission churches (in Gdańsk and Legnica). In their teaching and practice the ERC in Poland follow the two main Reformers: Martin Luther and John Calvin.

Doctrine 
The confessional standards of the ERC in Poland are the Three Forms of Unity.

Magazine
The ERChurches in Poland publish a quarterly magazine Reformacja w Polsce.

Association
CREC EuropeERC Poland

Reformed denominations in Europe
Protestantism in Poland